The 2011–12 season was Reading Football Club's fourth consecutive season in the Championship since relegation from the Premier League in 2008. It was Brian McDermott's second full season in charge.

Despite a poor start, which saw them 23rd in the table at one point, Reading went on to win 17 of 23 games in the second half of the season, securing the Championship title and ensuring promotion back to the Premier League. McDermott was named the LMA Championship Manager of the Season for the achievement.

Season review

Pre-season

Transfers

On 2 June Reading announced that long time defender and club captain Ívar Ingimarsson was being released, along with David Mooney, Abdulai Bell-Baggie, Danny Joyce, James Rowe and Erik Opsahl. It was also revealed that Julian Kelly and Scott Davies were also leaving to join Notts County and Crawley Town respectively. 
On the same day Reading announced the signings of Australian youth internationals, and brothers, Cameron and Ryan Edwards from Perth Glory and the Australian Institute of Sport respectively, as well as confirming that Mikele Leigertwood would be joining from Queens Park Rangers for a substantial fee upon the opening of the transfer window. On 6 July Reading released pictures of their new kits for the upcoming season. On 7 July Matthew Mills was sold to Leicester City for a substantial fee, rumoured to be £5 million. On 13 July the official squad numbers were released for the season along with Jobi McAnuff being named the new club captain following Matt Mills' departure.
On 25 July Reading announced that Bongani Khumalo had joined them on a season-long loan from Tottenham Hotspur, and would take the number 26. On 8 August Shane Long was sold to West Brom for an undisclosed amount, believed to be £4.5 million, rising to £6.5 million in clauses.

Friendlies
On 2 June Reading announced that they would be partaking in a pre-season trip to Slovenia to play a two games between 11 and 20 July, but the opponents had yet to be confirmed. It was also announced that Reading would have a friendly away against Northampton Town on 27 July. The Reading team split into the first team and the Reading X1. The Reading XI played their first pre-season friendly against Eastleigh F.C. losing 3–2, with goals from Jordan Obita and Gozie Ugwu. Obita's goal then lead him to being called up to the first 11's trip to Slovenia. The Reading XI's second pre-season game was against Swindon Supermarine and they won 3–0 with goals from Brett Williams, Michael Cain and David Murphy. On Reading's second game of their tour of Slovenia they lost 3–1 to Karabükspor. Sinan Kaloğlu scored first for Karabükspor after 2 minutes, before Brynjar Gunnarsson equalised 2 minutes later. Sinan Kaloğlu went on to secure the win for Karabükspor, and secure his hat trick, with goals in the 18th and 40th minutes.

August
On 1 August, Ben Hamer joined Charlton Athletic for an undisclosed amount. Reading started the season on 6 August with a 2–2 draw against Millwall. Millwall took the lead through ex-Reading striker Darius Henderson on 49 minutes, before John Marquis doubled their lead on 62. Reading then brought on substitute Mathieu Manset who scored a quickfire double in the 86th and 89th minutes to level the game and share the points. On 9 August it was announced that Reading's first round League Cup game against Charlton Athletic at The Valley was postponed after police advice, along with a host of other football fixtures including the International friendly between England and the Netherlands, due to the ongoing 2011 London riots.  Reading's second game of the season was away to Leicester City on 13 August. Reading came away with a victory thanks to second half goals from Noel Hunt and Hal Robson-Kanu. Reading's midweek clash was away to Portsmouth on 16 August, and ex-Reading striker Dave Kitson scored the only goal of the game in the 51st minute to subject Reading to their first defeat of the season. On 20 August Reading hosted Barnsley and suffered their second defeat of the season, losing 2–1. Barnsley took the lead in the 27th minute through Stephen Foster. Reading started off the second half by winning two penalties in the space of three minutes. First of all Jimmy Kebe was fouled by Jay McEveley in the box, but the resulting penalty was saved from Ian Harte. The second penalty saw Hal Robson-Kanu fouled in the area and this time Harte handing the ball to Noel Hunt, whose penalty was again saved. On 68 minutes Barnsley doubled their lead thanks to Matt Done. Reading pulled one goal back after being awarded a third penalty on 74 minutes, this time Hal Robson-Kanu took penalty and converted it past Luke Steele.
Reading signed defender Joseph Mills from Southampton on a free transfer on 20 August and followed it with the signature of Kaspars Gorkšs from Queens Park Rangers for an undisclosed amount on the 24th. On 26 August, Reading signed Adam Le Fondre from league two Rotherham United for an undisclosed fee, believed to be around £400k, and two days later Brett Williams went the opposite way to Rotherham United on loan until the end of January 2012.
Then next day Reading played Hull City away and suffered their third defeat in a row courtesy of a Robbie Brady goal, leaving Reading in 20th place at the end of August.

September
Reading started September by losing their fourth straight game, with defeat at home to Watford on the 10th. The goals in this game came from Mark Yeates on 12 minutes and John Eustace on 51, this defeat saw reading drop to 23rd in the championship. 7 days later Reading hosted Doncaster Rovers at home and managed to holt their losing streak by winning 2–0 thanks to goals from Simon Church and Adam Le Fondre's first for the club. On 24 September, Reading visited Coventry City and drew 1–1, both goals came in the first half. Coventry took the lead through Gary McSheffrey after 2 minutes but Simon Church equalised 8 minutes later.

On 27 September Reading announced that midfielders Jake Taylor and Brian Howard had joined Exeter City and Millwall respectively on loan. Later on in the day Reading faced Bristol City at Ashton Gate, with Bristol City taking a 2–0 lead with goals from Albert Adomah in the 22nd and Brett Pitman in the 58th minute. However, Reading came back to win 2–3 after Jobi McAnuff and Adam Le Fondre both scored within 3 minutes of each other before Mathieu Manset found the winner in the fourth minute of stoppage time.

October
Reading started October with a 0–0 home draw against Middlesbrough on 1st and followed it up 10 days later with an away win at Burnley thanks to a Jem Karacan goal in the 9th minute of injury time. Reading's next game on 19 October was a 2–2 draw at home to Derby County, Theo Robinson opened the scoring in the 59th minute, with Adam Le Fondre equalising in the 65th minute. Tomasz Cywka restored Derby's lead in the 75th minute only for Le Fondre to get his second, and square the game two minutes later. On the 22nd Reading hosted Southampton in that weekend's late kickoff, Mikele Leigertwood put Reading in front in the 71st minute. Southampton then had Dean Hammond sent off for two yellow cards in the 70th and 77th minute, but Steve De Ridder managed to equalise in the 80th minute to end the game 1–1. Reading's last game of October saw them go away to Crystal Palace and earn a 0–0 drawn, which meant that they had gone the month without defeat and extended their unbeaten run 8 games.

November
Reading's first game of November was an away trip to Nottingham Forest which the lost 1–0 after a 75th strike from Marcus Tudgay, this ended an 8-game unbeaten run. On the 6th, Reading hosted Birmingham City, and thanks to a 75th strike from Noel Hunt, won the game 1–0. 19 November saw Reading host Cardiff City at the Madjeski Stadium. Cardiff took the lead through a 2nd-minute goal from Peter Whittingham, while Mark Hudson made it 2–0 in the 70th minute. Reading pulled one goal back in the 77th through Jimmy Kebe but could not find a second, losing the game 1–2. The following weekend Reading travelled to Ipswich Town. Ipswich took the lead in the 56th minute after a Daryl Murphy strike before Kaspars Gorkss briefly leveled things in the 76th before another Ipswich goal in the 79th minute by Josh Carson. Reading managed to still all 3 points with 2 goals in stoppage time thanks to Alex Pearce in the 91st and Noel Hunt 93rd. Reading's last game of November was at home to Peterborough United, which they won 3–2. Peterborough took the lead through Tommy Rowe in the 16th minute before Simon Church equalised in the 27th. After the break Reading took the lead in the 78th minute thanks to Hal Robson-Kanu before extending their lead 2 minutes later through Adam Le Fondre. Emile Sinclair pulled a late goal back for Peterborough in the 90th minute.

December

January
On 1 January 2012, Marcus Williams left the club on a free transfer to join Sheffield United. The next day Reading suffered their first defeat in four games away at Cardiff City, losing 3–1. All the goals came in the first half with Cardiff taking a 3–0 lead through Joe Mason, Aron Gunnarsson and Kenny Miller, before Jobi McAnuff scored Reading solitary goal on half time. On 7 January 2012, Reading were knocked out of the F.A. Cup by League One side Stevenage, after losing 1–0 at home to a Darius Charles goal in the 20th minute. On 9 January 2012, it was announced that Alex McCarthy had signed a contract extension until 2015, and also gone out on loan to Ipswich Town for three months. On 12 January 2012 Reading announced the signing of Republic of Ireland U21 international Karl Sheppard from Shamrock Rovers on a free transfer. Reading returned to winning form on 14 January away at Watford. Watford took the lead through a Shaun Cummings own goal after 29 minutes, but Jimmy Kebe fired home the equaliser on 42 to see the sides in level at half time. Reading's winner was thanks to substitute Adam Le Fondre who netted with 5 minutes remaining to give Reading all the points. On 20 January, Reading announced that Russian investment group, Thames Sports Investment, had agreed a deal with Sir John Madejski to buy a significant holding in Reading FC. The deal see Madejski stay on as chairman until 2014, and provide Brian McDermott and Nick Hammond with funds to spend during the January transfer window. 21 January saw Reading lose at home to another promotion contender, Hull City when Robbie Brady scored the only goal of the game after 66 minutes. On 24 January, Jimmy Kebe signed a new contract keeping him at the club until the summer of 2014. On 26 January, Tomasz Cywka joined Reading on a Free transfer from Derby County until the end of the season. On the same day the club also announced the signing of Jason Roberts on an 18-month contract from Blackburn Rovers for an undisclosed fee. Two days later Jason Roberts scored on his debut against Bristol City, converting his saved penalty on 58 minutes after Louis Carey had been shown a straight red card.
On Transfer deadline day, 31 January 2012, Reading announced the signing of Matthew Connolly on loan till the end of the season from QPR, while Bongani Khumalo's loan was ended early and he returned to Tottenham Hotspur.

During January, Nigerian defender Chibuzor Okonkwo, was also on trial at the club.

February
  
February started off for Reading with the Postponement of their Championship game against Doncaster Rovers due to a frozen pitch at the Keepmoat Stadium. This game was later rescheduled for 13 March. On 8 February 2012, young defender Angus MacDonald joined League Two Torquay United on loan until the end of the season, and Brett Williams joined Northampton Town on loan for a month. Also on 8 February, Joseph Mills signed a new two-and-a-half-year contract, keeping him at The Madejski until 2014. On 9 February, another young Reading player – Lawson D'Ath – joined Yeovil Town on loan for a month. After the postponement of the Doncaster game, Reading's first game of February was a 2–0 win at home to Coventry City on 11 February, thanks to goals from Jimmy Kebe and Jason Roberts, his second in two games for Reading. They then travelled away to Derby County for a midweek game on the 14th, which they won 1–0 thanks to a 61st-minute goal from Noel Hunt. Reading where back at home on 17 February for the game against Burnley, which saw Jason Roberts net his third goal in four games to secure a 1–0 win.
On 22 February, after rumours linking him with the vacant Wolves job, Brian McDermott signed a new contract with Reading keeping him at the Madejski Stadium until 2015. On 24 February, it was confirmed that Mathieu Manset had joined Chinese Super League side Shanghai Shenhua on loan until 30 June 2012. The next day saw Reading in action against fellow promotion chasers Middlesbrough at the Riverside Stadium. Noel Hunt's first half goal and Ian Harte's superb free kick saw Reading come away with another three points, and meant that they had won all four games played in February.

March
On 2 March, it was announced that Jordan Obita would be joining Gillingham on loan for a month. On 3 March, Reading came from 1–0 down away to Millwall to win 2–1, thanks to goals from Hal Robson-Kanu and substitute Adam Le Fondre, to extended their winning run to 6 games. Reading extended their winning run to 7 on 6 March, with a 1–0 victory over Portsmouth thanks to a first half goal from Noel Hunt. On 8 March, it was announced that Brian McDermott had been nominated for February's Manager of the Month for four wins out of four, while Adam Federici had been nominated for Player of the Month for keeping four clean sheets in the four wins. The next day it was announced that both McDermott and Federici had won the awards. On 10 March, Reading played Leicester City at the Madejski Stadium and came away with their 8th win on the trot, 3–1, thanks to goals from Mikele Leigertwood, Jason Roberts and Simon Church with Neil Danns scoring Leicester City's consolation goal in the 92nd minute. On 13 March Reading played their re-arranged away fixture against Doncaster Rovers, which ended 1–1 ending Reading's winning streak but continuing their unbeaten run, their goal was courtesy of Alex Pearce. On 15 March, Reading announced the signing of Hayden Mullins on loan until the end of the season from Portsmouth. On 17 March, Reading headed to Barnsley, and after a goalless first half, early second half goals from Jobi McAnuff and Jem Karacan gave reading the lead. Reading added another from Karacan midway through the second half and then a fourth thanks to Jason Roberts in the 89th minute. This victory extended their unbeaten run to 10 games and moved them 3 points clear of West Ham United in second place. On 20 March Reading's unbeaten run came to an end away at Peterborough United, losing 3–1. Reading took the lead through Noel Hunt in the 20th minute, before George Boyd equalised 5 minutes later. Peterborough took the lead in the 34th minute thanks to Tyrone Barnett, before Paul Taylor finished the scoring 8 minutes from time. Despite the defeat Reading remained in 2nd place. On 22 March, Reading announced the loan signing of Benik Afobe from Arsenal until the end of the season. On 24 March, Reading got back to winning ways with a 3–1 home victory over Blackpool, with the goals coming from Ian Harte and Alex Pearce in the first half and Mikele Leigertwood in the second. Blackpools goal was scored by Lomana LuaLua. Alex McCarthy was recalled from his loan with Ipswich Town on 28 March due to an injury to Mikkel Andersen. Reading saw out March the way they started by winning their 6th game of the month, away to West Ham United. Reading went 1–0 down inside 10 minutes to Carlton Cole's goal, before two goals at the end of the first half through, Kaspars Gorkšs and Noel Hunt, saw Reading goal in at the break ahead. The second half saw a converted penalty from Ian Harte and a Ricardo Vaz Tê header make it 2–3, before Mikele Leigertwood sealed the win with his 4th goal of the season making it 2–4 victory to Reading.

April
On 5 April, it was announced that McDermott had been nominated for March's Manager of the Month, while Ian Harte had been nominated for Player of the Month. The next day before Reading's home game against Leeds United it was announced that McDermott had won the manager of the month. Reading's first game in April was on Good Friday against Leeds United, which they won 2–0 thanks to two late Adam Le Fondre goals after Leeds had Zac Thompson sent off in the 12th minute. Reading then travelled to Brighton & Hove Albion on 10 April, and secured a narrow 1–0 victory after a deflected Ian Harte free kick in the 14th minute. Reading then played Southampton at the St Mary's on 13 April. Reading took the lead through Jason Roberts in the 19th minute, before Rickie Lambert levelled it for the Saints in the three minutes into the second half. McDermott then introduced Adam Le Fondre as a 64th minute sub, who scored in the 72nd and 90th minutes to win the game 3–1 for Reading.

On 17 April, Reading beat Nottingham Forest 1–0 at home.  With West Ham United's 1–1 draw against Bristol City the same evening, Reading were automatically promoted to the Premier League. Four days later their 2–2 draw with Crystal Palace, coupled with Southampton's 2–1 defeat at Middlesbrough, ensured they would be promoted as division champions.

Reading's last game of the season was away to Birmingham City which they lost 2–0. On 3 May it was announced that Adam Le Fondre had been nominated for the April player of the month after scoring five goals during the month.

May
Following the close of the season, Brian McDermott was named Championship Manager of the Year at the League Managers Association Awards, as voted by fellow professional managers. Reading would release thirteen players at the end of the season, they included Andy Griffin, who played 42 games for Reading after joining the club in 2010, Brian Howard, who played 67 games for the club in three years and Tomasz Cywka, who joined Reading in the January, but only played four times.

Transfers

In

Out

Loans in

Loans out

Released

Squad

Left club during season

Competitions

Pre-season friendlies

Championship

Results summary

Results by round

Fixtures and results

League table

League Cup

Reading's First Round tie against Charlton drawn for 9 August 2011 was postponed on police advice due to the riots happening in London. It was later rearranged to be played on Tuesday, 23 August 2011.

FA Cup

Squad statistics

Appearances and goals

|-
|colspan="14"|Players who appeared for Reading but left during the season:

|}

Top scorers

Disciplinary record

Awards

Player of the season

LMA Manager of the Year: Championship

PFA Team of the Year: Championship

Player of the Month

Manager of the Month

Team of the Week

PFA Player in the Community

Championship Apprentice of the Year

Team kit
The 2011–12 Reading F.C. kits.

|
|
|
|}

Notes

References

Reading F.C. seasons
Reading